Supertalent in Vlaanderen ("Supertalent in Flanders") was the Dutch language format of the Got Talent series created by Simon Cowell. It premiered on 15 March 2007 on the Dutch language channel VIER. It was hosted by Dré Steemans and Ann Van Elsen. The judges of the series were Paul Jambers, Martine Prenen and Gert Verhulst. The winners of the series were Triple E who are the singing trio sisters.

Got Talent
2007 Belgian television series debuts
2007 in Belgian television
Belgian reality television series
Belgian music television shows
Belgian television series based on British television series
Play4 (TV channel) original programming